Edward Everett Holland (February 26, 1861 – October 23, 1941) was an American lawyer, banker, and politician who served as a U.S. Representative from Virginia from 1911 to 1921.

Early life and education
Born near Suffolk, Virginia to the former Ann Scott Pretlow and her husband, Zechariah Holland, Holland attended private schools. He attended the Richmond College, then studied law at the University of Virginia School of Law in Charlottesville, Virginia.

He was admitted to the bar in 1882 and commenced practice in Suffolk, Virginia.
He served as mayor of Suffolk in 1885–1887, then was elected the Commonwealth's attorney (prosecutor) for Nansemond County, serving from 1887–1907.

Holland became president of the Farmers Bank of Nansemond in 1892.
He served as a member of the State senate from 1908 to 1911.

Holland was elected as a Democrat to the Sixty-second and to the four succeeding Congresses (March 4, 1911 – March 3, 1921).
He was not a candidate for renomination in 1920.
He resumed his banking pursuits.
He served as delegate to the Democratic National Convention in 1920 and 1924.
He served as member of the Senate of Virginia during the years 1930–1941.

Death and legacy
He died in Suffolk, Virginia, on October 23, 1941, and was in Cedar Hill Cemetery, Suffolk, Virginia.
His home at Suffolk, the Building at 216 Bank Street, was added to the National Register of Historic Places in 1985

Electoral history

1910: Holland was elected to the U.S. House of Representatives defeating Republican H.H. Humble and Independent C.E. Good, winning 78.99% of the vote.
1912: Holland was re-elected defeating Progressive Nathaniel T. Green and Independents Isaiah A. Chesman and B.D. Downey, winning 89.07% of the vote.
1914: Holland was re-elected defeating Socialist E.B. Everton and Socialist Labor S.L. Ford, winning 88% of the vote.
1916: Holland was re-elected defeating Republican Luther B. Way and Socialist Robert D. McElvary, winning 83.06% of the vote.
1918: Holland was re-elected unopposed.

Sources

1861 births
1941 deaths
Virginia lawyers
Democratic Party Virginia state senators
University of Virginia School of Law alumni
Politicians from Suffolk, Virginia
19th-century American lawyers
19th-century American politicians
20th-century American lawyers
Democratic Party members of the United States House of Representatives from Virginia
20th-century American politicians
County and city Commonwealth's Attorneys in Virginia
Mayors of places in Virginia